Sydney Louis Anderson (13 January 1918 – 20 May 1944) was an Australian rules footballer who played with Melbourne in the Victorian Football League (VFL).

Family
The son of Sydney Sims Anderson (1888-1964), who became Town Clerk of the City of Port Melbourne,  and Adela Myrtle Anderson (1884-1983), née Day, Sydney Louis Anderson was born on 13 January 1918.
 
He married Lorna Jean Waddell on 22 February 1941.

Football
A tall wingman, Anderson was a premiership player in every one of his three VFL seasons.

His father played 98 games for Port Melbourne in the VFA; his brother, Claude Anderson, played 2 games for South Melbourne; and his nephews (Claude's sons), Syd Anderson played 4 games for South Melbourne and 56 games for Port Melbourne, and Graeme Anderson played 71 games for Collingwood and 144 games for Port Melbourne.

Military service
Anderson enlisted in the Royal Australian Air Force in December 1941. Commencing as a Pilot Officer, he was promoted to Flying Officer in September 1943.

Whilst serving on air operations near Wewak in the Territory of New Guinea in 1944, Anderson's Bristol Beaufort was shot down by Japanese flak, and all aboard save one were killed, including Anderson.

Legacy
In 1949, his parents donated a trophy in his memory to the Melbourne Football Club, and the club decided to award the Syd Anderson Trophy annually to the player who came second in the club's best and fairest — the trophy to the winner was named after "Bluey" Truscott, and the trophy to the season's third best and fairest player was named after Ron Barassi Sr.

See also
 List of Victorian Football League players who died in active service

Footnotes

References
 Main, J. & Allen, D., "Anderson, Syd", pp. 203–206 in Main, J. & Allen, D., Fallen — The Ultimate Heroes: Footballers Who Never Returned From War, Crown Content, (Melbourne), 2002. 
 World War II Nominal Roll: Flying Officer Sydney Louis Anderson (410192).
 World War II Service Record: Flying Officer Sydney Louis Anderson (410192).

External links

 
 Australian War Memorial Roll of Honour: Flying Officer Sydney Louis Anderson (410192).
 Commonwealth War Grave Commission: Flying Officer Sydney Louis Anderson (410192).
 DemonWiki profile
 Boyles Football Photos: Syd Anderson.
 Members of the Melbourne Football Club Team (September 1940), Collection of the Australian War Memorial.

1918 births
1944 deaths
Australian rules footballers from Melbourne
Melbourne Football Club players
Royal Australian Air Force personnel of World War II
Australian military personnel killed in World War II
Royal Australian Air Force officers
Melbourne Football Club Premiership players
Three-time VFL/AFL Premiership players
Military personnel from Melbourne
People from Moonee Ponds, Victoria